Yotha FC is a football club from Vientiane, Laos. Founded in 1997, the club was formerly known as MCTPC FC (Ministry of Communication, Transportation, Post and Construction), before changing their name to MPWT FC (Ministry of Public Works and Transport) in 2008. The club changed their name again to Yotha FC for the 2012 season. The club has won 3 championships of the Lao League in 2002, 2003 and 2011 and the Prime Minister's Cup in 2003 and 2007.

Continental record

Invitational tournament record

Achievements
Lao League: 3
2002, 2003 (both as MCTPC FC), 2011 (as MPWT FC).

Prime Minister's Cup: 2
2003 (as MCTPC FC), 2007 (as MPWT FC).Note 1

Lao National Games: 1
2008 (as MPWT FC)

Managers
 Bounlap Khenkitisak (1997–2009)
 Somsack Keodara (2010–2013)

References

Football clubs in Laos
1997 establishments in Laos